Marco Werner (born April 27, 1966 in Dortmund) is a professional racer from Germany. He was the eighth driver to complete the informal triple crown in endurance racing.

In his early career, Werner finished runner-up in the Formula Opel Euroseries in 1989 and runner-up in the German F3 series in 1991 behind Tom Kristensen.

Having failed to graduate to Formula One, Werner switched to sports car racing and touring car racing. Werner was a regular driver in the STW and Porsche Supercup during the 1990s, but he found more success in the 24 Hours of Daytona, which he won in 1995 in a Kremer-Porsche.

In 2001 he joined Audi Sport Team Joest, becoming a regular driver in the American Le Mans Series. Werner won the 24 Hours of Le Mans in 2005 with an Audi R8, and in 2006 and 2007 with an Audi R10.

In 2008, he co-drove the Audi R10 in the American Le Mans Series with Lucas Luhr to six overall victories and eight class wins, taking the LMP1 drivers title.

Racing record

Complete Deutsche Tourenwagen Meisterschaft/Masters results
(key) (Races in bold indicate pole position) (Races in italics indicate fastest lap)

Complete Super Tourenwagen Cup results
(key) (Races in bold indicate pole position) (Races in italics indicate fastest lap)

Complete 24 Hours of Le Mans results

Complete 12 Hours of Sebring results

External links
Marco Werner official site

1966 births
Living people
24 Hours of Le Mans drivers
24 Hours of Le Mans winning drivers
Sportspeople from Dortmund
German racing drivers
German Formula Three Championship drivers
Deutsche Tourenwagen Masters drivers
American Le Mans Series drivers
24 Hours of Daytona drivers
Racing drivers from North Rhine-Westphalia
Porsche Supercup drivers
12 Hours of Sebring drivers
G+M Escom Motorsport drivers
Audi Sport drivers
Team Joest drivers
Phoenix Racing drivers
Abt Sportsline drivers
Nürburgring 24 Hours drivers
Level 5 Motorsports drivers